Heritage Christian School is a private, fundamentalist, Baptist Christian school located in Findlay, Ohio. Heritage is a ministry of Calvary Baptist Church of Findlay, Ohio.

History
The school caught national media attention in 2009 by suspending 17-year-old Tyler Frost for going to his girlfriend's public school prom. The student was not permitted to attend graduation on May 24, 2009, due to his violation of school policy against students listening to rock and roll and dancing. School officials said he could complete his final exams separately to receive a diploma.

References

External links
Official website

Christian schools in Ohio
Baptist schools in the United States
Findlay, Ohio
High schools in Hancock County, Ohio
Private high schools in Ohio